Hugo Filipe Cabral Pina (born 16 February 1984) is a Portuguese former professional footballer who played as a defensive midfielder.

Club career
Born in Lisbon, Pina spent some time at Sporting CP's youth academy, making his senior debut with their reserves in the third division. He went on play professionally in the second tier of Portuguese football for C.D. Olivais e Moscavide and Atlético Clube de Portugal.

Abroad, Pina represented Córdoba CF and CD Guadalajara in the Spanish Segunda División B.

References

External links

1984 births
Living people
Portuguese footballers
Footballers from Lisbon
Association football midfielders
Liga Portugal 2 players
Segunda Divisão players
Sporting CP B players
C.D. Olivais e Moscavide players
G.D. Ribeirão players
A.D. Lousada players
Clube Oriental de Lisboa players
S.C.U. Torreense players
Atlético Clube de Portugal players
C.D. Mafra players
U.D. Leiria players
S.U. Sintrense players
S.U. 1º Dezembro players
Casa Pia A.C. players
Segunda División B players
Córdoba CF players
CD Guadalajara (Spain) footballers
Portuguese expatriate footballers
Expatriate footballers in Spain
Portuguese expatriate sportspeople in Spain